The W. Howard Frankland Bridge is the central fixed-link bridge spanning Old Tampa Bay from St. Petersburg, Florida to Tampa, Florida. It is one of three bridges connecting Hillsborough County and Pinellas County; the others being Gandy Bridge and Courtney Campbell Causeway. The bridge carries Interstate 275 and is by far the most traveled of the bay's bridges.

Work began in fall 2020 to rebuild this bridge with separate pedestrian and bicycle lanes, with completion expected in late 2025. The new bridge will be north of the existing bridge. This allows traffic to use the old bridge while the new wider bridge is under construction. The existing southbound bridge will be converted to northbound lanes, once the new bridge is completed.

The bridge is often incorrectly referred to as the Howard Franklin Bridge.

History
Named for the man who proposed it, Tampa businessman Howard Frankland, the bridge opened in April 1960 and carried four lanes (two lanes in each direction separated by a short, narrow barrier). The bridge and approaches cost $16 million.

Because of the bridge's design, including its lack of emergency shoulders, it proved to be dangerous. Accidents were common on the bridge and traffic backed up on both sides, leading to local nicknames, the "Howard Frankenstein Bridge" and "The Car-Strangled Spanner". In 1962, a steel-reinforced tapered concrete barrier was installed "to prevent cars from hurtling the median and crashing into oncoming traffic." Ten people had already died. The bridge was the subject of a 60 Minutes broadcast in the 1960s noting the below-average construction methods used.

Planning for a larger-capacity replacement began in 1978. Original plans ranged from a large, multi-lane suspension (or similar type) bridge, to two parallel bridges (with the central span reserved for HOV lanes). As traffic projections increased, further exacerbated by a disaster on the Sunshine Skyway Bridge in 1980, it was clear that the new bridge would need to handle at least eight lanes (four in each direction). By 1987, it was concluded that a parallel, four lane span would be built. Plans were also made to rehabilitate the older bridge after the new bridge opened.

Construction began on the new span in 1988. The new $54 million southbound span was opened to traffic in 1990. The older bridge was then closed, rehabilitated, and reopened in 1992. The older northbound span is shorter and has a steeper hump than the newer southbound span.

Bypass system

Before the parallel bridge was built, I-275 utilized a bypass designation system. Whenever there would be a major delay at the Howard Frankland Bridge, special signs would alert drivers to the delay and direct them to utilize the bypass, which ran along SR 694 and across the Gandy Bridge, to the Lee Roy Selmon Expressway, Willow Avenue, Howard Avenue, and ending at Interstate 275. Special shields (marked N and S) along the route made sure that drivers were using the correct thoroughfare.

Reconstruction of the bridge 

After the widening project in 1992, Interstate 275 was increased to eight lanes on the bridge itself. However, this did not increase capacity on either end of the bridge. Backups were still seen on the Howard Frankland heading into Tampa, primarily due to a bottleneck at the SR 60/Veterans Expressway exit. On the St. Petersburg side, after a comprehensive reconstruction project that took over ten years, lane counts were increased from four lanes prior to the bridge to six lanes through downtown St. Petersburg, and eight lanes from Gandy Boulevard to the bridge.

A reconstruction project was planned to begin in 2017 for the new Gateway Expressway project, a plan to build a new toll road to connect different parts in Pinellas County. However, FDOT planned to reconstruct the interstate in smaller phases rather than the original larger two-phase project and the start of construction was delayed to 2020. 

Once the reconstruction project is finished in 2025, major traffic congestion on the Howard Frankland bridge is expected to be significantly reduced by the addition of new lanes. On January 7, 2021, FDOT postponed by a week to January 16, 2021 the start date for removing an overpass and the corresponding exit ramp over I-275. It had been scheduled to shut down by 8 p.m., EST, January 9, through January 10. This work was part of the U.S. $600 million toll road project. On January 16 to 17, 2021, workers removed the 4th street north interchange bridge (overpass) from 8 p.m. on January 16, to 12 p.m. on January 17. Exit 32 was closed until late 2021 while the new overpass is  constructed.

Overall construction on this large project began in fall 2020 and completion is expected in late 2025. A completely new bridge will carry southbound traffic. Once that bridge is completed, the existing southbound bridge will be converted to carry northbound traffic. When all traffic is moved to the final alignment, the existing northbound bridge will be removed. The newly built bridge for southbound traffic will include a separate pathway for pedestrian and bicycle traffic, and additional vehicle traffic lanes.

See also

References

External links
 Howard Frankland Bridge page at Interstate275Florida.com
 I-275 plan hits $100M bump Article on the 2006 I-275 expansion setback St. Petersburg Times (June 28, 2006)

Bridges completed in 1960
Bridges completed in 1990
Transportation in Tampa, Florida
Buildings and structures in St. Petersburg, Florida
Transportation in St. Petersburg, Florida
Road bridges in Florida
Interstate 75
Bridges on the Interstate Highway System
Expressways in the Tampa Bay area
1960 establishments in Florida
Bridges over Tampa Bay
Transportation buildings and structures in Hillsborough County, Florida
Transportation buildings and structures in Pinellas County, Florida